Jakub Marek (born June 22, 1991) is a Czech professional ice hockey player. He is currently playing for EHC Waldkraiburg of the Bayernliga.

Marek made his Czech Extraliga debut playing with Motor České Budějovice during the 2011-12 Czech Extraliga season.

References

External links

1991 births
Living people
Motor České Budějovice players
Stadion Hradec Králové players
Czech ice hockey forwards
Sportspeople from České Budějovice
HC Litvínov players
IHC Písek players
HC Berounští Medvědi players
Czech expatriate ice hockey players in Germany